Johnny M. Hunt (born July 17, 1952) is an American evangelical Christian pastor, author, and former president of the Southern Baptist Convention. He was also formerly senior pastor of First Baptist Church Woodstock, in Woodstock, Georgia. He was the first Native American president of the SBC. He previously served as the Senior Vice President of the Evangelism & Leadership division of the North American Mission Board—the church planting and domestic evangelism arm of the SBC—speaking nationally to church leaders and congregants about sharing the Christian Gospel.

Early life 
Hunt was born in Lumberton, North Carolina.  He is a member of the Lumbee Native American Indian tribe based in North Carolina. Hunt's father left the family when he was seven. He became an alcoholic and gambler at a young age, dropping out of school at 16 and managing a pool room. Hunt experienced a radical conversion to Christianity during this time, which he details in his book, Out of the Poolroom. After his conversion, he was mentored by several men from his home church in Wilmington, North Carolina and came to the realization that God had called him to ministry. He has earned degrees from Gardner-Webb College and the Southeastern Baptist Theological Seminary, and has also received honorary doctorates from Immanuel Baptist Theological Seminary, Covington Theological Seminary, and Tennessee Temple University.

Family 
He is married to Janet Allen Hunt of Wilmington, North Carolina. They have two daughters: Deanna Hunt Carswell and Hollie Hunt Hixson. They also have three granddaughters: Katie Carswell, Hope Hixson, and Addie Hixson. He has one grandson, Carson Carswell.

Career 

Hunt has held ministry positions at Lavonia Baptist Church, Mooresboro, North Carolina (July 1976–August 1979), Falls Baptist Church in Wake Forest, North Carolina (1979–1980), Longleaf Baptist Church, Wilmington, North Carolina (May 1981–December 1, 1986), and at First Baptist Church in Woodstock, Georgia (1986 to December 2019).  First Baptist Woodstock is one of the largest churches in the United States.  Under his ministry the church grew from about 1,000 to more than 19,000 members.

In June 1996, Hunt was named the President of SBC Pastor's Conference.  On March 11, 1997, the Johnny Hunt Chair of Biblical Preaching was established at the Southeastern Baptist Theological Seminary.  In June 2008, Hunt succeeded Frank Page as president of the Southern Baptist Convention, and served in that capacity for 2 years.
He was succeeded by Bryant Wright.

In November 2016, His church celebrated his 40 years in ministry and serving as senior pastor at First Baptist Woodstock Church for 30 years.

In August 2018, Johnny, alongside his wife Janet, announced to FBC-Woodstock that he would be transitioning out of his full-time pastoral position to fulfill a Senior VP ministry for the North American Mission Board.

Johnny left First Baptist Church of Woodstock after a tenure of 33 years.

Scandal 
In May 2022 he resigned from the North American Mission Board after a report investigating the Southern Baptist Convention's handling of sex abuse cases was released and included an accusation that he had sexually assaulted another pastor's wife in 2010 which the report found credible. Hunt denied the accusation.   The Guideposts Report states: 
"We include this sexual assault allegation in
the report because our investigators found the pastor and his wife to be credible; their
report was corroborated in part by a counseling minister and three other credible
witnesses; and our investigators did not find Dr. Hunt’s statements related to the sexual
assault allegation to be credible."

Johnny Hunt has since admitted to allegations but claims the encounter was consensual.

Publications

See also
List of Southern Baptist Convention affiliated people
Southern Baptist Convention
Southern Baptist Convention Presidents

References

External links 
 Official website of First Baptist Church - Woodstock, Georgia
 It's a New Day Ministries - Official website of Dr. Hunt
 

1952 births
Living people
20th-century Native Americans
21st-century Native Americans
American evangelicals
Baptists from North Carolina
Baptist writers
Lumbee people
Native American leaders
People from Lumberton, North Carolina
People from Woodstock, Georgia
Southern Baptist Convention presidents
Southern Baptist ministers
Sexual abuse scandals in Protestantism